İkiköprü is a town (belde) in the Beşiri District of Batman Province in Turkey. The town is populated by Kurds of the Reşkotan tribe and had a population of 3,455 in 2021. It is populated by both Muslims and Yazidis.

The town is divided into the neighborhoods of Karaduman, Kıyanç and Turgut Özal.

References 

Kurdish settlements in Batman Province
Populated places in Batman Province
Yazidi villages in Turkey
Beşiri District